Cortinarius subcastanellus is a species of mushroom native to New Zealand. It was originally described in 1982 as Rozites castanella by mycologists Egon Horak and Grace Marie Taylor.

References

External links

subcastanellus
Fungi described in 1982
Fungi of New Zealand
Taxa named by Egon Horak